Mihtagalak (English: I Need You) is the debut studio Album by Lebanese singer Nancy Ajram. It was released on October 2, 1998, by EMI Music Arabia.

Background and composition

After winning the gold medal in a Lebanese reality television competition Noujoum Al-Moustakbal and prior to signing with EMI, Ajram was discovered by renowned Lebanese musician Fouad Awwad, whom she studied music with.

At the age of 13, Ajram released her first singles edtitled "Hobbak Allam Albi El Gheere" and "Oulha Kelma Ala Shani", which were ultimately excluded from the album. A few months later, Ajram signed with EMI Music Arabia to record a full-length album.

In Mihtagalak, Ajram collaborated with several known songwriters and musicians, including Shaker Al Mouji, George Karam, Dsouki Abdel Hafez, Issam Zgheib, Antoine Al Shaack, Kamal Al Taweel and Elie Al Aliya.

The only music video in the album for the lead single "Mihtagalak", was directed by Elie Feghali in Lebanon.

Release and impact

Mihtagalak was officially released in late 1998. According to Ajram, the contract with EMI didn't help her back then as the album received no attention on media, although the lead single "Mitagalak" peaked within the top ten of single charts in Lebanon.

Track listing
Standard edition

 Note: Credits were adapted from the album liner notes.

References

Nancy Ajram albums
1998 debut albums
Arabic-language albums